Yanis Cimignani (born 22 January 2002) is a French professional footballer who plays as a midfielder for  club Ajaccio.

Career

Early years
Born in Lyon, France, Cimignani grew up in Ghisonaccia on the island of Corsica. He joined the main club of his commune, US Ghisonaccia at only three years old and played there until he was eleven. He then joined Bastia where he stayed for three years but was forced to leave the club due to the demotion of the club to Championnat National 3 and as a result losing their academy licence. Cimignani was then contracted by Ajaccio, joining their youth setup in 2015.

Ajaccio
On 31 January 2020, Cimignani signed his first professional contract with Ajaccio. Cimignani made his professional debut with Ajaccio in a 1-0 loss to Châteauroux on 22 August 2020.

Personal life
Cimignani was born in France to a Corsican-father and Burkinabè mother.

References

External links
 
 Yanis Cimignani at AC Ajaccio

2002 births
Living people
French people of Corsican descent
French sportspeople of Burkinabé descent
French footballers
Footballers from Lyon
Footballers from Corsica
Association football midfielders
Ligue 1 players
Ligue 2 players
Championnat National 2 players
Championnat National 3 players
SC Bastia players
AC Ajaccio players